Salsa is an Australasian genus of orb-weaver spiders.

Description 
Spiders of this genus have total length 3.2-6.1 mm (males) or 6.5–10.5 mm (females). The carapace ranges in colour from yellowish brown to reddish brown, and is normally covered with yellowish white setae. The dorsal surface of the abdomen is pale brown to beige and has a variable darker folium (leaf-like) pattern. The ventral surface is variable but is usually darkest in the middle and has lateral pale bands that may be elongate, ovoid, or spindle-like in shape.

Salsa can be distinguished from similar spider genera by the abdomen having a single posterior tubercle and ventral pale bands. In males, the pedipalp has a C-shaped median apophysis and teeth-like tubercles inside its basal arch. In females, the epigyne has a transparent scape that is generally shorter than the epigyne plate.

Habitat 
Salsa occur in a range of different habitats, including forests (rainforests, dry sclerophyll and open forest), lagoon vegetation, swamps and gardens.

Species 
Many of these species were previously assigned to other genera, such as Araneus, Cyclosa or Epeira.

 Salsa brisbanae
 Salsa canalae
 Salsa fuliginata
 Salsa neneba
 Salsa rescherchensis
 Salsa rueda
 Salsa tartara

References 

Araneidae
Araneomorphae genera
Spiders of Australia